Mascha Müller (born May 8, 1984 in Munich, Germany) is a German actress and best known for her role as Luise von Waldensteyck on the soap opera Verbotene Liebe (Forbidden Love).

Mascha began acting with sixteen on a little stage, called Bühne Moosberg, which was founded by her mother, playing the role of the legendary Anne Frank. She succeeded her acting schooling on the International School for Acting in Munich. Her first television roles were little parts in the crime solving show Aktenzeichen XY… ungelöst and the scripted documentary Die Abschlussklasse.
After that she became guest parts in the primetime sitcom Hausmeister Krause – Ordnung muss sein and in the telenovelas Storm of Love and Lotta in Love, followed by main parts in stage plays in Munich.
In 2007, Mascha took the part of Vanessa Eichoff in the short-lived soap opera Maple Avenue.
In November 2007, she started filming for Verbotene Liebe and was first seen on-screen on January 21, 2009 in the role of Luise von Waldensteyck. With a fast popularity by the audience it became her biggest success yet.

Filmography
2005: Aktenzeichen XY… ungelöst (segment: 'Bankraub') as bank assistant
2005: Die Abschlussklasse (1 episode) as transvestite
2007: Maple Avenue (contract role) as Vanessa Eichhoff
2008: Der Bulle von Tölz (episode: 'Das Ende aller Sitten') as Jana Fitz
2009–present: Verbotene Liebe (contract role) as Luise von Waldensteyck
2009: Pfarrer Braun (episode: 'Glück auf! Der Mörder kommt!') as Ulla Wiehr

External links
 Mascha Müller in the Internet Movie Database
 Official Homepage

1984 births
Living people
German soap opera actresses
Actresses from Munich
German television actresses